Godfrey Philip Gower was the fifth Bishop of New Westminster and Metropolitan of British Columbia.He was born on 5 December 1899, educated at Imperial College, London and  St. John's College, University of Manitoba and ordained in 1931. He then held incumbencies in Camrose, Edmonton and Vancouver. He was elected Bishop of New Westminster in 1951 and  Metropolitan of British Columbia in 1968, retiring from both posts in 1971. He died on 23 August 1992.

Notes

1899 births
Clergy from London
Alumni of Imperial College London
Anglican bishops of New Westminster
20th-century Anglican Church of Canada bishops
20th-century Anglican archbishops
Metropolitans of British Columbia
1987 deaths